The Iconic Tower is a skyscraper in the New Administrative Capital of Egypt. It will have 77 floors, mostly for office use, and is one of 20 towers being built as part of the Central business district in the new capital city. The total area of the tower exceeds .

Construction 
Construction of the Iconic Tower officially began in May 2018. Egyptian Prime Minister Mostafa Madbouly visited the construction site to attend a ceremony that marked the start of concrete pouring operations on the foundations in 2019. China State Construction Engineering is the main contractor for the project, which employs over 5,000 workers.

The tower project's architect of record is Dar al-Handasah Shair & Partners. The overall plan for the new Cairo development project, led by the Egyptian Ministry of Housing, includes 20 high-rises in the complex surrounding Iconic Tower.

It was planned and inspired by the shape of a pharaonic obelisk, with the glass exterior representing the Egyptian god Amun’s Shuti crown.

The tower is expected to be completed in the first quarter of 2023. Upon completion, it will be the tallest building in Africa, overtaking The Leonardo in South Africa.

See also 
 List of tallest buildings and structures in Egypt
 List of tallest buildings in Africa
List of tallest buildings
List of future tallest buildings

References 

Skyscrapers in Egypt
Skyscraper office buildings